Novaya Pechuga is a rural locality (a village) in Sergeikhinskoye Rural Settlement, Kameshkovsky District, Vladimir Oblast, Russia. The population was 177 as of 2010.

Geography 
Novaya Pechuga is located 20 km northwest of Kameshkovo (the district's administrative centre) by road. Lubentsy is the nearest rural locality.

References 

Rural localities in Kameshkovsky District